Cheganly (Sağanlı) is a rural locality (a village) in Annovsky Selsoviet, Belebeyevsky District, Bashkortostan, Russia. The population was 148 as of 2010. There are 3 streets.

Geography 
Cheganly is located 18 km north of Belebey (the district's administrative centre) by road. Annovka is the nearest rural locality.

References 

Rural localities in Belebeyevsky District